Spital am Pyhrn is a municipality in the district of Kirchdorf an der Krems in the Austrian state of Upper Austria.

Geography
Spital lies in the Traunviertel. About 48 percent of the municipality is forest, and 19 percent is farmland.

References

Cities and towns in Kirchdorf an der Krems District